Burgena chalybeata is a moth of the family Noctuidae. It is found in New Britain.

References

Moths described in 1896
Agaristinae